Ozyorno-Kuznetsovsky Leskhoz is a rural locality (a settlement) in Ozyorno-Kuznetsovsky Selsoviet, Uglovsky District, Altai Krai, Russia. The population was 304 as of 2013. It was founded in 1958. There are 4 streets.

Geography 
Ozyorno-Kuznetsovsky Leskhoz is located 30 km north of Uglovskoye (the district's administrative centre) by road. Ozyorno-Kuznetsovo is the nearest rural locality.

References 

Rural localities in Uglovsky District, Altai Krai